Spurilla croisicensis is a species of sea slug, an aeolid nudibranch. It is a shell-less marine gastropod mollusc in the family Aeolidiidae.

Distribution
This species was described as common at Le Croisic, France. It was redescribed under the name Spurilla onubensis.

Description
Spurilla croisicensis is variable in colour, with this variation being correlated with age.

References

Aeolidiidae
Gastropods described in 1923